(North Frisian Nees) is a municipality in the district of Nordfriesland, in Schleswig-Holstein, Germany. It consists of the halligen (islands) Langeneß and Oland. Before the flood of 1634 the two islands were directly attached.

Langeneß itself has 16 Warften and is the largest Hallig.  It has about 100 inhabitants and 58 households. There is a junior school and an information centre providing information about the national park and the Wadden-Sea at Peterswarf.  A railway connects Langeneß to the mainland at Dagebüll via Oland.  There is also a daily ferry service.

References

External links

 

Halligen
Tidal islands of Germany
Nordfriesland
Islands of Schleswig-Holstein